Sihuan Pharmaceutical is a Chinese pharmaceutical manufacturer with headquarters in Beijing and branch office in Haikou, Hainan Province. The main company in the group is the holding company Sihuan Pharmaceutical Holdings Group Ltd, which is listed on the Hong Kong stock market.

Sihuan Pharmaceutical is collaborating with the Academy of Military Medical Science in the development of the drug JK-05, intended for the treatment of Ebola virus disease. The company has been challenged by Fujifilm Holdings Corporation, which has stated that JK-05 infringes its patent rights regarding Avigan.

References

External links 
 http://www.sihuanpharm.com/

Pharmaceutical companies of China
Manufacturing companies based in Beijing